Martin the Warrior is a fantasy novel by Brian Jacques, published in 1993. It is the sixth book in the Redwall series. It is also one of the three Redwall novels to be made into a television series, alongside the self-titled novel (Season 1) and "Mattimeo" (Season 2).

Subdivisions 
The Prisoner and the Tyrant
Actors and Searchers
The Battle of Marshank

Plot

Martin the Warrior tells the story of a young mouse named Martin, a slave in Marshank under the cruel stoat Badrang the Tyrant. When Badrang leaves Martin to be tortured by the weather and the birds, a young mousemaid named Laterose, or Rose (with whom Martin falls in love) and a mole named Grumm hear his cry of defiance. They become instrumental in helping Martin, along with a squirrel named Felldoh, and Rose's brother Brome, escape Marshank. When that is accomplished, they decide to travel to Noonvale to rouse an army to attack Marshank. However, in the ocean, Felldoh and Brome are separated from Rose, Martin, and Grumm. Felldoh and Brome meet up with the Rambling Rosehip Players, a travelling band of creatures, and join forces with them, eventually freeing the slaves as Brome bluffs his way into and out of Marshank, disguised as a rat from Captain Tramun Clogg's corsair crew. Meanwhile, Martin, Rose and Grumm meet a hedgehog named Pallum after being imprisoned by pigmy shrews. They are eventually freed by saving the life of the Pygmy Queen's son, Dinjer, along with Pallum, who in turn joins up with them.

After a long series of adventures, the four adventurers reach Noonvale, Rose and Grumm's home. They gather an army there, but it is not large enough. But all is not lost. Boldred, a scholarly owl whom they met on the way to Noonvale, helps gather a huge army, including the pigmy shrews and the Gawtrybe (a group of savage squirrels). The entire army then sails to Marshank and reach it in good timing, since the Rambling Rosehip Players are in a predicament. Badrang and all of the vermin under his command, with the exception of mad Cap'n Tramun Clogg, are slain.

Rose is killed in the final battle by the very tyrant she had gone with Martin to defeat. After the battle, Martin, along with Ballaw, Rowanoak, Brome, and Keyla all stay in Polleekin's treehouse for the short rest of the season. Martin is devastated, his one love gone, and has nowhere to go. He declines going back to Noonvale with the rest, the memory of Laterose lingering too strong, not to mention he'll have to tell Urran Voh what had happened to his daughter. He makes a vow not to tell anyone about his friends or Noonvale, to protect them from enemies. He decides simply to relate a tale of living by the sword in the caves until the time came to move on southward.

The story of Martin and Rose is later brought to Redwall during the time of Abbot Saxtus by Aubretia, a descendant of Brome, and Bultip, a descendant of Pallum, who brought a sprig of climbing-rose culled from that which grew on Rose of Noonvale's grave. This becomes the Laterose of Redwall. In the passing of Spring to Summer, it blooms year round a bit later than the rest, and that is why it is called the Laterose.

Characters
Martin the Warrior
Badrang the Tyrant
Tramun Clogg
Felldoh
Laterose of Noonvale (Rose)
Grumm Trencher
Brome
The Rambling Rosehip Players
Ballaw
Celandine
Buckler
Kastern
Rowanoak
Trefoil
Pallum
Barkjon
Keyla
Fuffle
Hillgorse
Druwp
Urran Voh (Rose's father)
Aryah (Rose's mother)
Luke the Warrior, father of Martin
Boldred the owl
Hortwingle (Horty) (Boldred's husband)
Emalet (the owl's daughter)
Queen Amballa

Translations
(Dutch) De Roodburcht 
(Finnish) Urhea Martin
(French) Rougemuraille: Le Fils de Luc
Tome 1 : Tarkan le tyran
Tome 2 : Les Baladins de l'Églantine
Tome 3 : La Longue route
Tome 4 : La Bataille de Marpoigne
(German) Redwall: Martin der Krieger
Der Gefangene und der Tyrann
Der Ruf nach Freiheit
(Hungarian) Martin a harcos
(Italian) Martino il Guerriero
(Norwegian) Helten av Redwall
(Swedish) Martin Krigaren
(Russian) Мартин Воитель

Animated series adaptation
In February 2021, Netflix announced that an animated streaming television series based on the novel is in the works.

References

External links
 Plot summary at Redwall.org

Children's fantasy novels
British children's novels
British fantasy novels
Redwall books
1993 British novels
1993 children's books
1993 fantasy novels
British novels adapted into television shows
Hutchinson (publisher) books